= HD 132029 =

Star in the constellation Boötes

Observation data Epoch J2000 Equinox ICRS
- Constellation: Boötes
- A
- Right ascension: 14^{h} 55^{m} 58.59235^{s}
- Declination: +32° 18′ 00.2240″
- Apparent magnitude (V): 6.12
- B
- Right ascension: 14^{h} 55^{m} 58.94470^{s}
- Declination: +32° 17′ 58.4915″
- Apparent magnitude (V): 10.35

Characteristics
- Spectral type: A2V
- U−B color index: +0.07
- B−V color index: +0.087

Astrometry
Radial velocity (R_{v})	−12.1 km/s
Absolute magnitude (M_{V})	+1.22

A
Proper motion (μ)	RA: −54.033 mas/yr Dec.: −3.128 mas/yr
Parallax (π)	9.4783±0.0524 mas
Distance	344 ± 2 ly (105.5 ± 0.6 pc)

B
Proper motion (μ)	RA: −54.327 mas/yr Dec.: −1.841 mas/yr
Parallax (π)	9.5813±0.0172 mas
Distance	340.4 ± 0.6 ly (104.4 ± 0.2 pc)

Details

A
Mass	2.4 M_{☉}
Radius	2.5 R_{☉}
Luminosity	44 L_{☉}
Surface gravity (log g)	4.02 cgs
Temperature	9.434 K
Rotational velocity (v sin i)	64 km/s
Age	440 Myr

B
Mass	0.81 M_{☉}
Radius	0.82 R_{☉}
Luminosity	0.41 L_{☉}
Surface gravity (log g)	4.46 cgs
Temperature	5,099 K
Age	11.9 Gyr

Other designations
- BD+32°2531, HD 132029, HIP 73068, HR 5569, SAO 64408

Database references
SIMBAD	data
- B

HD 132029 is a double star in the northern constellation of Boötes. The two stars share a common proper motion and lie about 340 light years away.

The primary star is an A-type main-sequence star with a spectral class of A2V and an apparent magnitude of 6.1, just visible to the naked eye om ideal conditions. The 10th-magnitude companion lies at an angular separation of 4.6″ along a position angle of 110° (as of 2010).

The A-type star is over twice as massive as the Sun and over 40 times as luminous. It has an effective temperature of 9,434 K. The fainter secondary has only 80% of the Sun's mass and 40% of its luminosity and its photosphere is at a temperature of 5,099 K.
